This is a list of churches in Ulcinj. Montenegro (Albanian: Ulqin).

See also 
List of mosques in Ulcinj

Ulcinj
Churches in Montenegro